Smoki Whitfield (born Robert Whitfield, and sometimes credited as Jordan Whitfield) was an African American actor, comedian, and musician.

Biography 
Smoki was born in Pittsburgh to John Whitfield and Effie Walker. He attended the University of Oregon, where he was a star athlete and made appearances in school plays.

In the 1940s he began a career as a character actor in Hollywood. He appeared in a third of the 12 Bomba, the Jungle Boy films. Over the next few decades, he amassed more than 50 on-screen credits. In the 1950s, he worked as a manager and MC at a number of Hawaiian nightclubs. He later worked at the Top Banana Club in North Hollywood.

Whitfield died in 1967 of a heart attack in North Hollywood after a lengthy illness. He was survived by his wife Eileen Jackson and two sons.

Selected filmography 

 The Virginian (1969) (TV)
 The F.B.I. (1967) (TV)
 The Donna Reed Show (1966) (TV)
 Laredo (1965–1966) (TV)
 The Farmer's Daughter (1964) (TV)
 The Great Adventure (1964) (TV)
 The Magical World of Disney (1959–1961) (TV)
 Take a Giant Step (1959)
 The Last Angry Man (1959)
 M Squad (1959) (TV)
 The Rebel Set (1959)
 The Louisiana Hussy (1959)
 Kathy O' (1958)
 The Cry Baby Killer (1958)
 Guns Don't Argue (1957)
 Jet Pilot (1957)
 The Benny Goodman Story (1956)
 Jungle Jim (1955) (TV)
 One Desire (1955)
 Lord of the Jungle (1955)
 Seven Angry Men (1955)
 Killer Leopard (1954)
 The Golden Idol (1954)
 Safari Drums (1953)
 African Treasure (1952)
 Crazy Over Horses (1951)
 Callaway Went Thataway (1951)
 Journey Into Light (1951)
 The Lion Hunters (1951)
 Bomba and the Hidden City (1950)
 The Second Woman (1950)
 Bomba on Panther Island (1949)
 Bomba: The Jungle Boy (1949)
 Out of the Storm (1948)
 Jungle Goddess (1948)
 Another Part of the Forest (1948)

References 

1918 births
1967 deaths
University of Oregon alumni
American film actors
Male actors from Pittsburgh